The University of Suffolk is a public university situated in Suffolk and Norfolk, England. The modern university was established in 2007 as University Campus Suffolk (UCS), and the institution was founded as a unique collaboration between the University of East Anglia and the University of Essex. The university's current name was adopted after it was granted independence in 2016 by the Privy Council and was awarded university status.

The University of Suffolk is spread over four campuses: a central hub in Ipswich, and further campuses which focus on foundation courses that are located in Bury St Edmunds, Lowestoft and Great Yarmouth (the latter in Norfolk, not Suffolk). The university operates six academic faculties and in  had  students. Some 8% of the student body are classed as international students, 53% are classed as mature students, and 66% of the university's students are female.

The university was ranked in the top 10 for Course and Lecturers in the WhatUni Student Choice Awards 2019.

The current chancellor of the University of Suffolk is Helen Pankhurst, an appointed Commander of the Order of the British Empire (CBE), as well as a scholar, writer, and the great-granddaughter of Emmeline Pankhurst.

History
In 2003 Suffolk County Council established a "stakeholder group" to investigate the possibility of establishing a university in the county. Suffolk was the largest English county that did not host a university. The group included representatives from the University of East Anglia, the University of Essex, West Suffolk College, the East of England Development Agency, the Higher Education Funding Council for England, Suffolk Learning and Skills Council, Suffolk County Council, Ipswich Borough Council, Suffolk Chief Executive's Group and the Suffolk Development Agency.

Following funding pledges from Ipswich Borough Council and Suffolk County Council in 2004, the plan was backed by the Higher Education Funding Council for England (HEFCE) with £15m worth of funding in 2005 and attracted a £12.5m grant from the East of England Development Agency in 2006 The institution was officially launched under the name 'University Campus Suffolk' on 1 August 2007 and welcomed its first students in September of the same year.

Because UCS did not have degree-awarding powers, its students received their degrees from either the University of East Anglia or the University of Essex via a cooperative agreement. The institution was later granted degree-awarding powers by the Quality Assurance Agency for Higher Education in November 2015, and in May 2016 it was awarded University status by the Privy Council. As a consequence, UCS was renamed The University of Suffolk in August 2016 and began awarding degrees in its own right.

Campuses

Ipswich
The University of Suffolk's main hub is located in Ipswich on the historical Ipswich Waterfront. The Ipswich campus is spread across a compact area on the Waterfront with various university buildings. The principal university building is known simply as the Waterfront Building and was designed by RMJM Architects, the Waterfront Building was opened in September 2008 and cost £35 million to build. It has three lecture halls and 34 smaller teaching rooms.

The six-storey James Hehir Building was officially opened in March 2011 at a cost of £21 million It is named after the former chief executive of Ipswich Borough Council and includes Cult Cafe. Campus North houses the library or "Learning Resource Centre". Onsite student accommodation is provided in the 600-room Athena Hall, located adjacent to the James Hehir building.

The most recent addition to the growing campus is The Hold, which houses the majority of the Suffolk Record Office's collection and provides various facilities to the university including a lecture hall.

The Ipswich campus offers a range of undergraduate and postgraduate courses, including Art and Design, Business Management, Computing, Education, Film, Law, Nursing and Midwifery.

Great Yarmouth 
The Great Yarmouth centre is located at the Southtown site of East Coast College in neighbouring Norfolk. Subjects such as Computing, Counselling, Engineering, Fashion, Music, and Photography are available at the centre, which has a modern recording studio.

Lowestoft
The Lowestoft Centre is located at the site of East Coast College.  Lowestoft offers degrees in Children's Care, Learning and Development, Design, Inclusive Practice and Integrated Working, Operations Engineering, Supporting Inclusive Learning and Practice, and Social Science.

Partnerships 

The University of Suffolk has partnered with two Further Education colleges, East Coast College and Suffolk New College, that serve students in the Suffolk area. It also has partnerships with the Global Banking School, London School of Commerce, Unicaf, and Unitas, an education charity specialising in criminal justice.

Organisation and administration

Faculties and departments 

The university is split into four schools, each facilitating various courses.

• School of Social Sciences and Humanities.

• Suffolk Business School.

• School of Health and Sports Sciences.

• School of Engineering, Arts, Science and Technology – EAST.

East Contemporary Art Collection 
The University of Suffolk is home to the "East Contemporary Art Collection", which is exhibited at the Waterfront Gallery. Founded by artists Robert Priseman and Simon Carter in 2013 the "East Contemporary Art Collection" contains 160 works of art by 115 artists and was formed to make the first public collection of contemporary art in the East of England.

Artists represented in the collection all have a working connection with the seven east of England counties of Suffolk, Norfolk, Essex, Cambridgeshire, Lincolnshire, Bedfordshire and Hertfordshire and included Maggi Hambling, Amanda Ansell, Susan Gunn, Nicholas Middleton, Justin Partyka, Anne Schwegmann-Fielding, James Dodds, Linda Ingham, Stephen Newton and Mary Webb. The works of art in the collection were all produced after the year 2000 and are designed to be available for public display and as a learning resource for the university and students from the wider educational community.

Sustainability 
The university operates as a "Centre for Applied sustainability". An example of its work with sustainability is the Phase 1 campus development which was assessed as BREEAM Excellent. This signifies that the development is setting the "best practice in sustainable development".

The university is also actively engaged in the New Anglia Local Enterprise Partnership Green Economy Pathfinder.

Student life

Student housing 
The on-campus halls of residence, Athena Hall, is located on the Ipswich Waterfront and houses up to 590 students. Athena Hall offers a mixture of cluster flats and studio rooms. There is currently no accredited accommodation for the partner colleges in Bury St Edmunds, Great Yarmouth and Lowestoft.

Union 
The Union was formed on 1 August 2007, the same day the university was officially launched. It provides support for its students and looks after their well-being during their studies.

The union is the representative of the student body at the management level of the university, and as such its positions are staffed by paid and unpaid students who are based at the Union office in the heart of the campus's East building. The Union also looks after the university social calendar, with multiple events run during the academic weeks and special Freshers weeks at the beginning of each academic year.

The president and vice-president of the Union are, subject to a sufficient number of votes, elected every March, and take office for 12 months from July to July, overseeing the totality of one academic year. The candidates come from the student body and must compete in the election campaigns in March/April. There is a current two-year maximum term for the positions. The current president is Daniel Goulborn and the vice-president is Mauro Cardoso, both newly elected for 2020.

Academic profile 
As one of the newest universities in the UK, the University of Suffolk does not carry the same level of recognition and reputation as other older universities around the country. As it stands, the university ranks low on national rankings but has made good progress with its worldwide recognition in recent years, bringing in many students from the UK and abroad seeking an education in a fully modern establishment. The university was ranked in the top 10 for Course and Lecturers in the WhatUni Student Choice Awards 2019, which was based on a survey of over 41,000 students nationwide, rising 60 places from the previous year.

Rankings
The University of Suffolk ranked 129 by The Complete University Guide in 2021.

Notable alumni 
Leila Lopes – Miss Universe 2011

References

External links
Official website
Union
Suffolk New College
East Coast College
LEAP

 
University of East Anglia
University of Essex
Buildings and structures in Ipswich
Education in Ipswich
Educational institutions established in 2007
2007 establishments in England
Universities established in the 21st century
Suffolk